Luis Pércovich Roca (14 July 1931 – 23 April 2017) was a Peruvian politician. Pércovich served as the President of the Chamber of Deputies from July 1981 to July 1982. He served as Prime Minister of Peru from 14 October 1984 to 28 July 1985.

Biography 
He was born in the Yungay city, on July 14, 1931. Son of the Yungaíno marriage formed between the architect Gerónimo Pércovich and the lady Rosa Roca Osorio. Grandson of the Croatian-Austrian engineer Miguel Perković, from Dalmatia, and Dr. Asunción Roca, a native of Yurma, Piscobamba. He completed his primary and secondary studies at the Salesian College of Yungay and continued his career as a pharmaceutical chemist at the National University of Trujillo, where he was leader of the University Front, graduating in 1954.

In 1965 he was elected vice dean of the Pharmaceutical Chemical College of Peru.

References 

Prime Ministers of Peru
Presidents of the Chamber of Deputies of Peru
1931 births
2017 deaths
Popular Action (Peru) politicians

People from Ancash Region